Woolbury, or Woolbury Ring, is the site of an Iron Age univallate hill fort on Stockbridge Down, Hampshire, England.

Description

The site is described as a strong hilltop camp covering 20 acres, with a single bank and ditch, and has commanding views over the surrounding area. The bank and ditch are well preserved to the west, the bank being 9 ft. high and 16 ft. above the bottom of the ditch. The eastern side has been ploughed out, and the ditch only remains to the north and south. The entrance is on the west side, the interior is down to permanent pasture. Only the southwest rampart (which includes the original entrance) is in National Trust ownership; the rest is private land.

The site is listed as a scheduled ancient monument no.52.

There are a number of other archaeological sites in the area, including for a Bronze Age bowl barrow mound of approximately 40m in diameter and 1.5m in height. The area is now subject to ploughing. In addition, several other tumuli are to be found to the south of the hill fort.

Location
Danebury hill fort lies close by to the West, over the River Test. The hill has a summit of 158m AOD.

White horse and cross
On the southern ramparts of Woolbury Ring is a hill figure of a horse. Whilst there are 17 white horse hill figures in England, with nine being nearby in Wiltshire, this is the only example in Hampshire. The horse was constructed crudely of rough flints, painted white and pushed into the ground to form the shape of the horse. The earliest documentation of the horse is in 1846. The horse for many years was covered by the surrounding bushes but in 1999, the site was cleared so the horse become visible again.

There was also a hill figure of a cross nearby only a few yards from Winchester Road, constructed using the same method. This was lost in 1944.

References

See also 
List of places in Hampshire
List of hill forts in England



Iron Age sites in England
Buildings and structures in Hampshire
Hill forts in Hampshire
Scheduled monuments in Hampshire